Oreocossus occidentalis is a moth in the family of Cossidae.

Distribution
It is found in Angola, Cameroon, the Democratic Republic of the Congo, Equatorial Guinea, Ethiopia, Kenya, Mozambique, South Africa, Tanzania and Uganda.

References
Strand, E. 1915d. Einige exotische, insbesondere afrikanische Heterocera. - Archiv für Naturgeschichte 81(A)(2):129–134.

Zeuzerinae